Lepidomys proclea is a snout moth in the genus Lepidomys. The species was described by Herbert Druce in 1895, and is known from Mexico (including the type location of Teapa, Tabasco) and the West Indies.

References

Moths described in 1895
Chrysauginae